The 2006–07 Basketball League of Serbia season was the 1st season of the Basketball League of Serbia, the highest professional basketball league in Serbia. It was also 63rd national championship played by Serbian clubs inclusive of nation's previous incarnations as Yugoslavia and Serbia & Montenegro.

Regular season

First League standings

* Source: srbijasport.net

Super League standings

* Source: srbijasport.net

P=Matches played, W=Matches won, L=Matches lost, F=Points for, A=Points against, D=Points difference, Pts=Points

(*)Qualification for Adriatic League

Playoff stage

Semifinals
1st Round

2nd Round

Final
1st Round

2nd Round

3rd Round

4th Round

Bracket

External links

Basketball League of Serbia seasons
Serbia